JSW Group is an Indian multinational conglomerate, based in Mumbai. It is led by Sajjan Jindal and is part of the O.P. Jindal Group. The Group's diverse businesses include steel, energy, infrastructure, cement and paints, across India, the United States, South America, and Africa.

Group companies
JSW Steel – JSW Steel has one of the world's largest single blast furnaces with a capacity of 4.8 MTPA. JSW's overall installed capacity is 23 MTPA.
JSW Energy – JSW Energy has a power generation capacity of 4559 megawatts (MW), out of which 3158 MW is thermal power, 1391 MW is hydropower and 10 MW solar power.
JSW Infrastructure – Based in Mumbai, its primary business interests are in the development of infrastructure for ports, roads, and rail connectivity.
JSW Cement – JSW Cement has a capacity of 17 MTPA.
JSW Ventures – JSW Ventures is the venture capital arm of JSW Group which invests in early-stage Indian startups.
JSW Sports – Through its subsidiary JSW Sports, the group also owns the Indian Premier League cricket team Delhi Capitals (in partnership with GMR Group), the SA20 cricket team Pretoria Capitals, the ILT20 cricket team Dubai Capitals, the Indian Super League football club Bengaluru FC, and the Pro Kabaddi League team Haryana Steelers.

Research and development 

 JSW School of Public Policy, Indian Institute of Management Ahmedabad.
 JSW Technology Hub, Indian Institute of Technology Bombay.

Memberships 

 World Business Council for Sustainable Development.

See also
 Inspire Institute of Sport

References

External links

 
Companies based in Mumbai
Conglomerate companies established in 1982
1982 establishments in Maharashtra
Indian companies established in 1982
Indian Premier League franchise owners